Akyürek is a Turkish surname meaning "white heart". Notable people with the surname include:

Akman Akyürek (1942–1997), Turkish judge
Engin Akyürek (born 1981), Turkish actor
Tahir Akyurek (born 1959), Turkish politician

See also
 Akyürek, Palu

Turkish-language surnames